Amer Đidić (born December 28, 1994) is a Canadian professional soccer player who plays as a centre-back for Pacific FC and the Canadian national team.

Club career

Early career
Born in Zenica, Bosnia and raised in Edmonton, Alberta, Canada, Đidić began playing soccer with Sherwood Park District SA and later spent time in the FC Edmonton Academy system before playing four years of college soccer at Baker University, where he was a two-time NAIA All-American. As a senior in 2015, he was named a NSCAA and NAIA All-American, as well as being named the Heart of America Athletic Conference Most Valuable Player.

Swope Park Rangers
Đidić was signed by United Soccer League side Swope Park Rangers on March 2, 2016. In August 2016, Sporting Kansas City announced that they had signed Đidić on a short-term loan, to play in the 2016-17 CONCACAF Champions League against Central FC. Đidić made his first team debut on August 16, 2016 in the competition. After receiving rave reviews in his first season with Swope Park Rangers, Đidić was named to the 2016 USL All-League First Team.

Sporting Kansas City
In May 2017, after six games with Swope Park in 2017, Đidić was signed by Sporting Kansas City for the remainder of the 2017 season, with options for 2018, 2019 and 2020. This made him the first Baker Wildcats soccer player to sign with an MLS club. He remained on loan with Swope Park for the remainder of the season. Upon conclusion of the 2017 season, Sporting KC announced they would exercise Didic's option for the 2018 season. Đidić made his first appearance for Sporting KC since the 2016 season when he started in a 2–0 victory over Real Salt Lake at Rio Tinto Stadium in the U.S. Open Cup Round of 32 on June 6, 2018. After three seasons with Sporting KC, Đidić was released at the end of the 2018 season.

San Antonio FC
In December 2018, Đidić signed with United Soccer League club San Antonio FC for the 2019 season. After starting the first two matches of the season on March 9 and 16, Đidić was relegated to the bench for the following two games before being left out of the matchday 18 in April. On April 15, 2019, Đidić and San Antonio agreed to mutually terminate his contract so that he could pursue other opportunities.

FC Edmonton
Right after his departure from San Antonio, Đidić signed with his hometown club, Canadian Premier League side FC Edmonton. That season, he made nineteen league appearances and one appearance in the Canadian Championship. While out of contract during the off-season, Đidić went on a preseason trial with Major League Soccer side Vancouver Whitecaps FC. On February 24, 2020, he concluded his trial with Vancouver and returned home. On March 2, 2020, Đidić officially re-signed with Edmonton for the 2020 season.

Pacific FC
On February 9, 2022, Đidić signed with champions Pacific FC.

International career
Đidić represented the Canadian Interuniversity Sport team at the Universiade in South Korea in 2015.

In March 2017, Đidić received his first Canadian youth national team call-up for an under-23 tournament in Qatar. In September of that year, he also received his first senior team call-up for a friendly against Jamaica, but did not appear in the match.

He was recalled to the national team in October 2019 for a CONCACAF Nations League match against the United States.

On January 10, 2020, he made his debut and scored his first goal against Barbados.

Personal life
When he was a toddler, Đidić and his family emigrated to Canada in the wake of the Bosnian War, eventually settling in Edmonton, Alberta.

Career statistics

Club

International

Scores and results list Canada's goal tally first, score column indicates score after each Đidić goal.

Honours
Individual
NAIA All-American: 2014, 2015
HAAC Most Valuable Player: 2015
NSCAA All-American: 2015
USL All-League First Team: 2016

References

External links
 
 

1994 births
Living people
Association football defenders
Canadian soccer players
Bosnia and Herzegovina footballers
Soccer players from Edmonton
Sportspeople from Zenica
Bosnia and Herzegovina emigrants to Canada
Yugoslav Wars refugees
Naturalized citizens of Canada
Canadian expatriate soccer players
Bosnia and Herzegovina expatriate footballers
Expatriate soccer players in the United States
Canadian expatriate sportspeople in the United States
Bosnia and Herzegovina expatriate sportspeople in the United States
Baker Wildcats men's soccer players
Sporting Kansas City II players
Sporting Kansas City players
San Antonio FC players
FC Edmonton players
Pacific FC players
USL Championship players
Canadian Premier League players
Canada men's youth international soccer players
Canada men's international soccer players